Július Pántik (15 January 1922 – 25 August 2002) was a Slovak film actor. He appeared in over 30 films between 1947 and 1992.

Selected filmography
 Warning (1946)
 Tank Brigade (1955)
 Kdo hledá zlaté dno (1974)

References

External links
 

1922 births
2002 deaths
Slovak male film actors